Rainer Eitzinger (born 26 June 1983) is an Austrian former professional tennis player. He turned professional in 2003, and he achieved his career-high singles ATP ranking of 166 in July 2006. He retired in 2011. He played mostly in the ATP challenger and the ITF Futures circuits. He also represented Austria in a Davis Cup match in 2006 vs. Mexico, where he defeated Daniel Garza.

References

Austrian male tennis players
Living people
1983 births
People from Schwaz
Sportspeople from Tyrol (state)